Oco, OCO or O.C.O may refer to:

 OCO (video game), a 2D minimalistic platform indie game
 Oco, a town in Navarre, Spain
 Oco, Ávila, a town in Ávila province, Spain
 O.co Coliseum in Oakland, California, United States
 Old Cornish language (ISO 639-3 code: oco)
 Online channel optimisation, particularly the use of tools such as A/B testing and marketing automation to improve websites' KPIs.
 Oort cloud object, distant bodies of the solar system
 Orbiting Carbon Observatory-2, successfully launched in 2014, or the original Orbiting Carbon Observatory, lost to a launch vehicle failure in 2009.
 Overseas Contingency Operation, a name for the United States War on Terror
 Overstock.com, American online furniture store
 One cancels other, particularly the use of OCO orders for buying and selling stocks and options on a contingent basis
 Carbon dioxide, with structural formula OCO (simplified to CO2)
 Offensive Cyber Operations, a term used by the US Military and other NATO allies.